The Central Canadian Bluegrass Awards, established in 1979, are presented annually by the Northern Bluegrass Committee at its Huntsville, Ontario festival. This event also hosts the annual meeting of the Bluegrass Music Association of Canada (BMAC).

Nominations for the awards are made by leaders in the central Canadian bluegrass music scene, and four nominees are chosen in each category. Ballots with the names of the nominees are distributed to members of the Northern Bluegrass Committee, BMAC and local bluegrass music clubs and associations in central Canada.

In November, when the ballots have been counted, Ontario bluegrass bands gather for a three-day event, Friday to Sunday, at the Deerhurst Inn in Huntsville, Ontario.  Participating bands are given the opportunity to showcase their talent during the weekend, and the awards are presented on Saturday evening in the hotel ballroom to a large audience. Bluegrass organizations throughout Ontario sponsor individual awards.

History
The first awards were given out in 1979 at Ontario Place in Toronto by Pat and Jack Buttenham, who produced Canadian Bluegrass Review magazine. The 1980 and 1981 awards were presented at the Minkler Auditorium at Seneca College, and the 1982 awards ceremony was held at the Arlington Hotel in the town of Bright.

For the next ten years the awards festival was held at the Academy Theatre in Lindsay, Ontario. When the event outgrew the theatre, it was moved to Huntsville to the more spacious Deerhurst Inn.

After Canadian Bluegrass Review ceased publication, the Northern Bluegrass Committee took over the administration of the awards in the central region.

Categories
The awards are given in the following categories:

Festival
The awards ceremony forms part of an indoor weekend winter festival at which bluegrass musicians from central Canada gather to perform for their fans, network, jam, attend workshops and listen to guest bands from the United States and other parts of Canada.

See also
List of bluegrass music festivals
List of country music festivals

References

External links
Northern Bluegrass Committee web site
Bluegrass Music Association of Canada

Music organizations based in Canada
Canadian music awards
Canadian country music
Canadian folk music
Huntsville, Ontario
Bluegrass music
Music festivals established in 1971